Viimsi peninsula is a peninsula in Viimsi Parish, Harju County Estonia.

The peninsula ends with Rohuneem cape.

References

Peninsulas of Estonia
Viimsi Parish